"Let There Be Love" is a song by English rock band Oasis from their sixth studio album, Don't Believe the Truth (2005). Written by Noel Gallagher, it is the third and the last Oasis song to feature Liam and Noel on lead vocals, the first being "Acquiesce" and the second being "Put Yer Money Where Yer Mouth Is". It was released on 28 November 2005 as the third and final single from the album in the United Kingdom and as the second single in the United States.

"Let There Be Love" reached number two on the UK Singles Chart and peaked atop the Scottish Singles Chart. In Ireland, the song reached number 14, becoming the band's 21st top-20 single there. Outside the British Isles, the song reached number two in Italy, but was a minor hit elsewhere, only managing to reach the top 90 in Germany and the Netherlands.

Background and recording
A Noel-sung demo for the track was recorded in 1999 during sessions for Standing on the Shoulder of Giants. A bootleg of these demo sessions was leaked onto the Internet in early 2000. This track was given the unofficial title "It's a Crime" on many bootlegs as the track was unknown and unreferenced anywhere before then. The album version of the song is structurally almost exactly the same as the demo with a slight change in melody in the part that Noel sings. The lyrics to the chorus remains intact, but the verses and bridge have totally rewritten lyrics. The single version of the song omits the second verse and chorus.

A second Noel-sung demo was released on the "Let There Be Love" DVD single. It has the same lyrics as the album version, and in fact the album version takes some elements from the demo such as the piano. It was probably recorded sometime in 2003 or 2004, prior to the main Don't Believe the Truth recording sessions.

Music video
The video is a montage of some of Oasis' live shows during the summer of 2005 including clips of the gigs at Hampden Park and the City of Manchester Stadium. The clips do not actually show the band playing 'Let There Be Love', as the band didn't play the song at either of these gigs. Later, the video clip appeared on their Don't Believe the Truth tour rockumentary, Lord Don't Slow Me Down.

Live performances
The song has only been played live twice, the first on an Italian radio show in late 2005 and the second closing a concert in Santiago de Chile, in 2006. However, both were acoustic performances featuring only Noel Gallagher. Oasis also performed the song on several television shows, such as BBC's Top of the Pops, but these TV performances were done by playback, so the song was never actually performed live by the entire band. The recording of the song was played at the last show of the Don't Believe the Truth Tour, in Mexico City.

Track listings

UK CD single
 "Let There Be Love"
 "Sittin' Here in Silence (On My Own)"
 "Rock 'n' Roll Star" (live at City of Manchester Stadium, 2 July 2005)

UK DVD single
 "Let There Be Love"
 "Let There Be Love" (demo)
 Excerpts from the forthcoming film Lord Don't Slow Me Down and the "Let There Be Love" video

UK 10-inch single and European CD single
 "Let There Be Love"
 "Sittin' Here in Silence (On My Own)"

Japanese CD single
 "Let There Be Love"
 "Rock 'n' Roll Star" (live at City of Manchester Stadium, 2 July 2005)
 "Don't Look Back in Anger" (live at City of Manchester Stadium, 2 July 2005)

Personnel
Oasis
 Liam Gallagher – lead vocals and tambourine
 Noel Gallagher – lead vocals, lead and acoustic guitars 
 Gem Archer – rhythm guitar
 Andy Bell – bass
 Zak Starkey – drums

Additional musicians
 Paul Stacey – piano and mellotron

Charts

Weekly charts

Year-end charts

Certifications

References

Oasis (band) songs
2005 singles
Songs written by Noel Gallagher
Song recordings produced by Noel Gallagher
Song recordings produced by Dave Sardy
Music videos directed by Baillie Walsh
Number-one singles in Scotland